John Glen Morlan (born November 22, 1947) is a former pitcher in Major League Baseball. He played for the Pittsburgh Pirates.

References

External links

1947 births
Living people
Major League Baseball pitchers
Pittsburgh Pirates players
Baseball players from Columbus, Ohio
Ohio Bobcats baseball players
Charleston Charlies players
Columbus Clippers players
Gastonia Pirates players
Geneva Pirates players
Monroe Pirates players
Niagara Falls Pirates players
Salem Pirates players
Salem Rebels players